The first season of Drop Dead Diva premiered on July 12, 2009, and concluded October 11, 2009, on Lifetime. Season one aired on Sundays at 9:00 pm ET for the entire season and consisted of 13 episodes.

Storylines

Jane/Deb
After Deb dies in a car accident and Jane dies from being shot, Deb ascends to heaven where she meets Fred and pushes the return button on his desk so she could return to earth but unknowingly she returns in the body of Jane, a brilliant, thoughtful and plus-size attorney. Deb wrestles with this new life. She has Jane's legal smarts but not her memories and brushes off odd behavior as aftereffects of Jane being shot. Her lack of Jane's memories does hurt at times such as when she sues a diet guru unaware until the trial that Jane did a commercial endorsing the product. In addition, Deb learned at Jane's Class of 1994 reunion that Jane was very unnoticed at high school and her prom date was gay. Deb also handles the sudden urge for treats and snacks she denied herself before as well as realizing how self-absorbed she used to be. When her mother comes to the firm to get a divorce, Deb assumes that it's because of her death but soon discovers her parents were unhappy for years and just staying together for Deb's sake. She handles that but is later jarred when her birthday comes along and she discovers Jane is eight years older. At Jane's birthday party, Deb is pleasantly surprised to find that while she had been tone-deaf, Jane has a great singing voice.

Deb wanted to tell Grayson who she actually was, but was devastated when he fell for fellow lawyer Kim Kaswell. Deb would later come to accept what had happen and told Grayson that she saw no problem about the two kissing, although Kim had decided already to tell Grayson that she did not want to start a relationship with him. She also was the one who warned her guardian angel Fred about falling for her best friend Stacy that would lead to memories of his existence being erased. When Jane's mother came to town to visit, Deb did her best to handle it, realizing the distance the mother and daughter had and deciding that if she couldn't be with her own mother again, she could at least have Jane's. Sparks also seem to fly between Jane and another lawyer, Tony as they embark on a relationship.

In the first-season finale, Deb/Jane helped a ballplayer win a lawsuit against a doctor who botched an operation on his arm but then discovered that the two had been in cahoots to rip off the insurance company. Warned that telling anyone would put her career in jeopardy, as she later learned that Jane could lose her license and be disbarred, Jane went ahead and filed evidence to the district attorney while also resigning from the firm. She was beginning to believe Grayson was interested in her as Jane but was jarred when a man named Ethan arrived at her home claiming to be Jane's husband.

Kim & Grayson
Grayson is still mourning Deb and when Deb is reborn in Jane, she recognizes how Kim is jealous of Jane's success and smarts. Kim is interested in Grayson, and they eventually kiss, only to have Kim end it there because she believes that Grayson wasn't ready to start a relationship. Grayson later pursues Kim and they date for a while but when Grayson can't seem to let Kim into the house he and Deb shared, Kim realizes Grayson is not yet ready to move on from Deb and breaks the relationship off.

Fred & Stacy
Fred meets Deb when she dies, and when he goes to cross her over she presses the return button on his desk and is sent back but into Jane's body. After Deb returns to earth in Jane's body she goes to Stacy and tells her that she is Deb, at first Stacy is suspicious but then after some convincing she believes that Jane is Deb. Fred is then sent to earth to look after Deb/Jane as her guardian angel and he gets a job as a mail clerk in the firm she works at. When Fred meets Stacy he falls in love with her and he ends up kissing her and they seem to go out together but the next day, Stacy claims to have no idea who he is. He leaves a note to Deb explaining that he ended up breaking rules with the kiss and was thus reassigned with all memories of him erased, except from Deb's mind. He returns later in season one, revealing he couldn't maintain his job because of his feelings for Stacy and thus gave up being an angel and took human form to return to Earth. However, he realized he was too focused on Stacy and told Deb/Jane he was leaving to learn more about being human. Unfortunately, Fred can still be recalled to Heaven even if he is human because he still has to keep an eye on Deb/Jane. He returned, claiming to have been traveling the world but later admitted he'd never left Los Angeles as he's been assigned back to looking over Deb/Jane.

Cast

Main cast
 Brooke Elliott as Jane Bingum (13 episodes)
 Margaret Cho as Teri Lee (13 episodes)
 April Bowlby as Stacy Barrett (13 episodes)
 Kate Levering as Kim Kaswell (13 episodes)
 Jackson Hurst as Grayson Kent (13 episodes)
 Josh Stamberg as Jay Parker (13 episodes)

Recurring cast
 Ben Feldman as Fred (9 episodes)
 Brooke D'Orsay as Deb Dobkins (5 episodes)
 David Denman as Tony Nicastro (4 episodes)
 Gregory Alan Williams as Judge Warren Libby (3 episodes)
 Vickie Eng as Judge Rita Mayson (3 episodes)

Guest cast
 Paula Abdul as Judge Paula Abdul (2 episodes)
 Rosie O'Donnell as Judge Madeline Summers (2 episodes)
 Rhoda Griffis as Paula Dewey (2 episodes)
 Sharon Lawrence as Bobbi Dobkins (1 episode)
 Faith Prince as Elaine Bingum (1 episode)

Episodes

Home release

References

External links
 Drop Dead Diva on Lifetime
 

2009 American television seasons